Carmelo D'Anzi (born 24 November 1956) is an Italian-American football coach and former player.

Born in Messina, Italy, he began his career with the Papa Giovanni XXIII club in Providence. He played for Cruz Azul from 1981 to 1982. In 1983, he joined the Tulsa Roughnecks of the North American Soccer League where he won the league title.  

He was inducted into the New England Soccer Hall of Fame in November 2006.

On 7 June 2010, D'Anzi was appointed manager of Wick in  West Sussex, England.

References

External links
 Carmelo D'Anzi - Tulsa Roughnecks stats at NASLjerseys.com

1956 births
Living people
American soccer coaches
American soccer players
American Soccer League (1933–1983) players
Liga MX players
Cruz Azul footballers
Expatriate footballers in Mexico
Italian emigrants to the United States
New York United players
North American Soccer League (1968–1984) players
Sportspeople from Messina
Sportspeople from Providence, Rhode Island
Rhode Island Oceaneers players
USISL coaches
Tulsa Roughnecks (1978–1984) players
Association football midfielders
Wick F.C. managers
Footballers from Sicily